The 2017 Pennsylvania State Athletic Conference Football Championship Game was held on December 2, 2017 at a John A. Farrell Stadium on the campus of West Chester University of Pennsylvania in West Chester, Pennsylvania. The Indiana Crimson Hawks repressed the West Division and West Chester Golden Rams the East Division. Play for the PSAC Championship offered an automatic bid into the NCAA Division II Football Championship.

Teams

#4 Indiana (PA)

The Crimson Hawks entered the Championship with a 10–0 record and a 7–0 in conference. Entering the game IUP outscored opponent by an average of 27 points per game.

Box score

Team statistics

Summary

Media
It was announced on March 17, 2017 that ESPN networks would be covering the game. Not until August 2017 was the specific channel announced, ESPN2 was announced as airing the game on August 11, 2017 but a time slot on ESPN3 was also held and announced. As of September 2017 no clarification on which channel will be airing the game. However ESPN will air it on either one of its sister channels.

References

External links
 Championship recap at PSAC sports

Championship Game
PSAC Football Championship Game
IUP Crimson Hawks football games
West Chester Golden Rams football games
December 2017 sports events in the United States
2017 in sports in Pennsylvania